The men's 25 metre small-bore rifle (originally called individual competition with miniature-rifle) was a shooting sports event held as part of the Shooting at the 1912 Summer Olympics programme. It was the first appearance of the event. The competition was held on Friday, 5 July 1912.

Thirty-six sport shooters from eight nations competed.

Results

References

External links
 
 

Shooting at the 1912 Summer Olympics